The Microstromatales are order of fungi in the class Exobasidiomycetes. The order consists of three families: the Microstromataceae, the Quambalariaceae, and the Volvocisporiaceae.

References

Ustilaginomycotina
Basidiomycota orders
Taxa described in 1997